The 2021–22 Scottish Premiership (known as the cinch Premiership for sponsorship reasons) was the ninth season of the Scottish Premiership, the highest division of Scottish football, and the 125th edition overall of the top national league competition, not including one cancelled due to World War II. Celtic claimed the league trophy back after an outstanding run with a 1–1 draw with Dundee United on 11 May enough to confirm them as champions. 

Twelve teams contested the league: Aberdeen, Celtic, Dundee, Dundee United, Heart of Midlothian, Hibernian, Livingston, Motherwell, Rangers, Ross County, St Johnstone and St Mirren.

The season began on 31 July 2021. In December, the Scottish Government imposed stadium capacity restrictions as part of its response to the new Omicron variant. As a result, the winter break was brought forward from 4 January to 27 December. The rule of five substitutions per match was also re-introduced (as used the previous season) after the winter break.

Teams
The following teams changed division after the 2020–21 season.

Promoted from the Championship
Heart of Midlothian
Dundee

Relegated to the Championship
Hamilton Academical
Kilmarnock

Stadia and locations

Personnel and kits

Managerial changes

Format
In the initial phase of the season, the 12 teams will play a round-robin tournament whereby each team plays each one of the other teams three times. After 33 games, the league splits into two sections of six teams, with each team playing each other in that section. The league attempts to balance the fixture list so that teams in the same section play each other twice at home and twice away, but sometimes this is impossible. A total of 228 matches will be played, with 38 matches played by each team.

League summary

League table

Results

Matches 1–22
Teams play each other twice, once at home and once away.

Matches 23–33
Teams play each other once, either home or away.

Matches 34–38
After 33 matches, the league splits into two sections of six teams i.e. the top six and the bottom six, with the teams playing every other team in their section once (either at home or away). The exact matches are determined by the position of the teams in the league table at the time of the split.

Top six

Bottom six

Season statistics

Scoring

Top scorers

Hat-tricks

Most assists

Source:

Clean sheets

Source:

Attendances
These are the average attendances of the teams. Games with restricted attendances are not included in these figures.

Awards

Premiership play-offs
The quarter-finals were contested by the teams placed third and fourth in the 2021-22 Scottish Championship. The winners advanced to the semi-finals to face the team placed second in the Championship. The final was contested by the semi-final winners and the team placed eleventh in the Premiership, with the winners securing a place in the 2022–23 Scottish Premiership.

Qualified teams

Quarter-finals

First leg

Second leg

Semi-finals

First leg

Second leg

Final

First leg

Second leg

Broadcasting

Live matches (UK and Ireland) 
Sky Sports has exclusive rights to the Scottish Premiership and will show up to 48 matches, and the Premiership play-off final. BBC Scotland will broadcast the Premiership quarter-final and semi-final play-off ties.

Due to the impact of the COVID-19 pandemic, clubs will continue to stream matches (not broadcast on Sky) to fans on a pay-per-view or "virtual season ticket" basis, whilst capacities in stadia are limited due to social distancing restrictions.

Highlights 
Highlights are broadcast on BBC Scotland's flagship Sportscene programme on both Saturdays and Sundays. Sky Sports also show highlights.

Gaelic-language channel BBC Alba has rights to broadcast repeats in full of 38 Saturday 3pm matches "as live" at 5.30pm. 

The SPFL also uploads the goals from every Premiership match onto its YouTube channel.

References

External links
Official website

Scottish Premiership seasons
1
1
Scot